Where Are They Now? may refer to:

Music
 "Where Are They Now", a song by Cock Sparrer, 1982
 "Where Are They Now?", a song by The Kinks from Preservation Act 1, 1973
 "Where Are They Now", a song by Nas from Hip Hop Is Dead, 2006

Television and film
 Oprah: Where Are They Now?, an American reality television series presented by Oprah Winfrey
 Where Are They Now? (American TV series), a music documentary show
 Where Are They Now? (Australian TV program), a pop culture documentary show
 Where Are They Now? (TVB), a Hong Kong talk show
 Where Are They Now?: A Delta Alumni Update, a 2003 mockumentary film by John Landis